Bolotnya is a rural locality (a village) in Kletnyansky District, Bryansk Oblast, Russia. The population was 224 as of 2010. There are 4 streets.

Geography 
Bolotnya is located 30 km southwest of Kletnya (the district's administrative centre) by road. Solovyanovka is the nearest rural locality.

References 

Rural localities in Kletnyansky District